meaning Refuge of Sinners is a Roman Catholic title for the Blessed Virgin Mary. Its use goes back to Saint Germanus of Constantinople in the 8th century.

Catholic tradition
In the Roman Catholic tradition, Eve is viewed as being responsible for the sufferings of humans since their fall and expulsion from paradise while the Virgin Mary is viewed as the source of all healing. She is the new Eve, who cannot eliminate the damage created by Eve, but limit it. Her fullness of grace, her position among the disciples of Christ and her title as Mother of God are seen as assurances that the Virgin Mary is a powerful intercessor.

Prayer
Refugium Peccatorum is one part of four Marian advocations in the Litany of Loreto, the others being Salus Infirmorum (healer of the sick) Consolatrix Afflictorum (consoler of the sad) and Auxilium Christianorum (help of Christians). Each advocation extolling Mary’s role as advocate for spiritual and corporeal mercy has a rich history, but in general, the notion of asking the Blessed Virgin Mary for help in temporal needs dates back to Saints Justin Martyr, Irenaeus and Ambrose of Milan.

Community
The Archconfraternity of the Immaculate Heart of Mary, Refuge of Sinners was established at Notre-Dame-des-Victoires in the 19th century, and spread throughout the world.

Art

The 18th century Jesuit preacher Antonio Baldinucci had a particular devotion to the Refugium Peccatorum image of Virgin Mary in the Church of the Gesu (Frascati) in Italy and commissioned a copy which he considered miraculous and carried it with him in his travels. The Jesuits spread copies of the image of the Madonna of Refuge in Mexico by the 19th century, and it began to be depicted in missions there, often with clouds surrounding the lower portion of the image of the Virgin Mary holding the Child Jesus.

In some 19th-century images, biblical scenes are included below the image of the Madonna, e.g. Peter's visions as well as the depiction of a safe harbor (Psalm 108:30).

The term "Refugium peccatorum" is also used other works of Roman Catholic Marian art. For instance, there is a marble statue representing the Virgin Mary, on the grand staircase of the old municipal palace in Venice, Italy. The name came from the fact that the convicts were allowed to stop in front of the Virgin Mary’s statue to pray for their soul on the way to the scaffold.

Feast
The traditional feast day of Our Lady, Refuge of Sinners is August 13. In Mexico, the feast day is observed on July 4. She is the patroness of California, where the (arch)dioceses there celebrate the feast on July 5.

Apparitions
Our Lady of Laus, which the Vatican approved in 2008, is named Refuge of Sinners because she asked for the conversion of sinners.

References

Gallery

Catholic Mariology
Titles of Mary